Barbara Wood is an American politician, who was elected to the Maine House of Representatives in 2020. She will represent the 38th House District as a member of the Maine Democratic Party.

Prior to her election to the legislature Wood served on Portland, Maine City Council. Her election to that body in 1988 made her the state's first out LGBTQ officeholder.

References

Lesbian politicians
LGBT state legislators in Maine
Democratic Party members of the Maine House of Representatives
Living people
21st-century American politicians
21st-century American women politicians
Portland, Maine City Council members
American LGBT city council members
Women city councillors in Maine
Year of birth missing (living people)
21st-century LGBT people
Women state legislators in Maine